Gus Johnson Jr. (December 13, 1938 – April 29, 1987) was an American professional basketball player in the National Basketball Association (NBA). A ,  forward–center, he spent nine seasons with the Baltimore Bullets, and his final season was split between the Phoenix Suns and the Indiana Pacers of the American Basketball Association (ABA).

One of the first forwards to frequently play above the rim, Johnson combined an unusual blend of strength, jumping ability, and speed; he was one of the first dunk shot artists in the NBA. His nickname "Honeycomb" was given to him by his college coach. He had a gold star set into one of his front teeth and shattered three backboards during his career.

As a member of the Baltimore Bullets, Johnson was voted to the All-Rookie Team for 1963–64, averaging over 17 points and twelve rebounds per game. He played in five NBA All-Star Games, was named to four All-NBA Second Teams, and was twice named to the All-NBA Defense First Team.  His number 25 jersey was retired by the Baltimore Bullets franchise. With the Pacers, he was a member of the 1973 ABA championship team.

Johnson was inducted into the Naismith Memorial Basketball Hall of Fame in 2010.

Early life
Born in Akron, Ohio, Johnson was one of six children. As a teenager, Johnson frequented bars and pool halls.

"Despite my ways," Johnson recalled for an article in Sports Illustrated, "I never got into any real bad trouble in Akron. I just drifted around. Nothing mattered except basketball and the Bible. I used to read the Bible all the time. I still do. I'm real big on Samson. He's helped me a lot, I suppose. He stimulates me."

Johnson attended Akron Central High School, where he was an all-state player, and did reasonably well in the classroom. Among his teammates was Nate Thurmond, a future hall of fame center. Despite Johnson's clear talent and athletic ability, he had just a few college athletic scholarship offers, which was fairly common for black high school athletes in the late 1950s.

College career

Johnson had enrolled at hometown Akron, but he left before basketball started and joined a nearby Amateur Athletic Union club. While playing for the AAU Cleveland Pipers of the National Industrial Basketball League in 1960, he was spotted by a former teammate of first-year Idaho head coach Joe Cipriano.

Johnson accepted Idaho's scholarship offer; he played a year at Boise Junior College to get his grades up as a sophomore, and averaged 30 points and 20 rebounds a game for the Broncos. Johnson then transferred up north to the University of Idaho in Moscow in 1962. The Vandals had a .500 season at 13–13 the previous season, and the addition of Johnson made an immediate impact as they won their first five games and were 12–2 through January. Idaho was actually undefeated through January with Johnson playing: due to NCAA rules (junior college transfer originally enrolled at a four-year school) at the time, he was allowed to play regular season games only, not tournaments. The Vandals went 1–2 without him at the Far West Classic in late December in Portland, and the victory was a one-pointer over WSU. A week earlier with Johnson, the Vandals routed the Cougars by 37 points in Moscow.

Johnson became known as "Honeycomb," a nickname Cipriano gave him because of his sweet play. As an experienced junior, he averaged 19.0 points and 20.3 rebounds per game during the 1962–63 season, leading independent Idaho to a 20–6 record, their best in 36 years. With Johnson and leading scorer Chuck White, the Vandals were at their best in their main rivalries, 4–0 versus Oregon, 4–1 versus Palouse neighbor Washington State, and 1–1 against Washington. Idaho's primary nemesis was Seattle University, led by guard Eddie Miles, who won all three of its games with the Vandals. Idaho lost its only game with Final Four-bound Oregon State at the Far West without Johnson, but won all three with Gonzaga, for a 9–3 record against its four former PCC foes and a collective 12–6 against the six Northwest rivals.  Attendance at the Memorial Gym was consistently over-capacity, with an estimated 3,800 for home games in the cramped facility. Johnson and center Paul Silas of Creighton waged a season-long battle to lead the NCAA in rebounding. Silas claimed this by averaging 20.6 per game, 0.3 per game more than Johnson's average.  Johnson also set the UI record with 31 rebounds in a game against Oregon. The Ducks' head coach Steve Belko, a former Vandal, called Johnson a "6' 6" Bill Russell," and "the best ball player one of my teams has ever played against..."

Despite their 20–6 record, the Vandals were not invited to the post-season. The 1963 NCAA tournament included only 25 teams: Oregon State and Seattle U. were selected from the Northwest. The 1963 NIT invited only twelve teams, with none from the Mountain or Pacific time zones. If the Vandals had been invited, Johnson again would not have been eligible to participate.

During his time at Idaho, Johnson's standing high jump ability led the Corner Club, a local sports bar, to establish "The Nail" challenge.

Johnson turned professional after his only season at Idaho, and Cipriano moved on to coach at Nebraska. Without Johnson (and White), the Vandals fell to 7–19 in 1963–64 and were 4–6 in the new Big Sky Conference, fifth place in the six-team league. They had a dismal 3–14 record through January and lost every game against their Northwest rivals, a collective 0–10 vs UW, WSU, UO, OSU, Seattle U., and Gonzaga.

Following his professional career, Johnson returned to Moscow to help commemorate the first basketball game in the newly enclosed Kibbie Dome, held on January 21, 1976. He participated in a pre-game alumni contest between former players of Idaho and Washington State.

Professional career

Baltimore Bullets (1963–1972)
Johnson got a somewhat late start as an NBA player, as he turned age 25 in December of his rookie season.  He was selected tenth overall in the 1963 NBA draft, taken in the second round by the Chicago Zephyrs, who were in the process of moving to Baltimore to become the Baltimore Bullets for the 1963–64 season.

Johnson was an immediate starter under Coach Slick Leonard and averaged 17.3 points and 13.6 rebounds per game. Johnson finished as the runner-up for the Rookie of the Year honors to Jerry Lucas of the Cincinnati Royals; Lucas went on to a hall of fame career with the Royals and New York Knicks. Lucas and Johnson had faced off against each other during high school in Ohio, and when the NBA All-Rookie Team was selected, Lucas, Johnson, and his former high school teammate Nate Thurmond were the top three stars of the team.

During their college years, Johnson and Thurmond had been overshadowed by Lucas, who drew recognition from the press as a star with the national champion Ohio State and the U.S. Olympic basketball team (1964). However, being considered just second-best in comparison with Lucas during college was a powerful motivating factor for Johnson when they both moved on to the NBA.

Playing with Baltimore under Coach Leonard, the young starting five, consisting of center Walt Bellamy, forwards Terry Dischinger and Johnson and guards Rod Thorn and Kevin Loughery were nicknamed the "kiddie corps."

Said Slick Leonard about a young Johnson, "I could see Gussie developing into one of the great defensive forwards of all time."

Johnson was both an outstanding inside scorer and an exciting open-court player for the Bullets, from the start. During his early years with the Bullets, an expansion team, regularly finished in last place not only in the Eastern Division, but in the entire NBA. However, with good first and second-round draft choices every year, the Bullets gradually grew to be a better team, adding these players – who all made the NBA All-Rookie Team: Johnson, Rod Thorn, Wali Jones, Jack Marin, Earl Monroe, and finally, the keystone of a championship team, Wes Unseld, who became both the Rookie-of-the-Year and the NBA Most Valuable Player for 1968–69. That same year, the Bullets won the NBA Eastern Division for their very first time.

Johnson was among the most effective two-way players of his time. His scoring moves around the basket were comparable to those of his peers Elgin Baylor and Connie Hawkins. Yet, however effective as Johnson was a post-up player, with his medium-range jump shot, and on the fast break, he was even more effective as a very sticky defender and a rugged rebounder throughout his time in the NBA. Indeed, he was one of the select few players who was quick enough to be paired against backcourt great Oscar Robertson, yet strong enough to hold his own against the taller forwards of the NBA in the front line.

Despite some nagging problems with his knees, Johnson was a member of the NBA All-Star Team five times. During his NBA career, Johnson averaged 17.1 points and 12.7 rebounds per game. He also scored 25 points in 25 minutes in the 1965 NBA All-Star Game.

Gus Johnson had his best years with the Bullets from 1968–71, including the watershed basketball year of 1968–69. While the Bullets improved, Johnson received more recognition from the press and the spectators for his outstanding play at forward. He was voted onto the All-NBA second-team during this time span. During the 1968–69 season, the Bullets achieved their best regular-season record, but were quickly swept out of the playoffs by the Knicks, largely because Johnson was sidelined during the playoff series with an injury.

After fading to third place in the Eastern Division in 1969–70, Johnson played a key role in Baltimore’s unexpected run to the Finals the following season by averaging 13 points and 10.4 rebounds per playoff game. First, the Bullets beat the Philadelphia 76ers in a grueling seven game semifinals series, then they upset the top-seeded and defending champion New York Knicks four games to three in the Eastern Conference Finals, and advanced to the NBA Finals. But injuries had decimated the team, and the Bullets were swept in four straight by the Milwaukee Bucks, led by Kareem Abdul-Jabbar, Robertson, and Bobby Dandridge.

Injuries kept Johnson on the bench for most of 1971–72, limiting him to 39 games and 6 points per game. That season would be his last with the team. The next season, the Bullets traded for Elvin Hayes and drafted Kevin Porter, making Johnson expendable. In nine seasons with Baltimore, he averaged 17.5 points, 12.9 rebounds, 2.9 assists and 35.2 minutes in 560 games.

Phoenix Suns (1972)
Johnson was traded to the Phoenix Suns on April 12, 1972, completing a transaction from two days prior when the Bullets acquired a second-round pick (25th overall) in the 1972 NBA draft and selected Tom Patterson. Johnson played 21 games before being waived on December 1. He averaged 7.8 points and 6.5 rebounds in 19.9 minutes under head coaches Butch van Breda Kolff (fired after seven games) and Jerry Colangelo, Johnson's former Baltimore teammate.

Indiana Pacers (1972–1973)
The Indiana Pacers, then of the American Basketball Association (ABA), picked up Johnson after he was recruited to the Pacers by his former Baltimore Coach, Hall of Fame inductee Slick Leonard. He played his first game with the Pacers on December 16, 1972, and became a steadying veteran influence on the young team, which went on to win the 1973 ABA championship.

"It doesn't hurt to have some veterans around, and Gus was great for team chemistry," Leonard said of adding Johnson to the Pacers.

Playing in 50 games with the Pacers, and reunited with his former Coach Slick Leonard, Johnson averaged 6.0 points and 4.9 rebounds, playing alongside 22 year-old future Hall of Famer George McGinnis, Hall of Famer Mel Daniels, Hall of Famer Roger Brown, Freddie Lewis, Donnie Freeman, Darnell Hillman and Billy Keller.

"Gus came to us at the end of his career when he had lost a lot of his physical abilities, but he really wanted a shot at making a run at a championship," recalled Darnell Hillman of Johnson's influence on the Pacers. "And his coming to the team made us that much more solid. He was a great, great individual. The locker room was where he was really an asset. He always knew the right things to say and he could read people. He knew who would be a little bit off or down and he could just bring you right back into focus and send you out on the floor. He was also very instrumental in being like an assistant coach to Slick on the bench. Sometimes when Slick didn't go to the assistant coach, he'd ask Gus."

In the ABA playoffs, Johnson and the Pacers defeated the Denver Rockets and Ralph Simpson 4-1 and the Utah Stars with Hall of Famer Zelmo Beaty and ironman Ron Boone 4-2 to advance to the ABA Finals against the Kentucky Colonels with Hall of Famers Artis Gilmore, Dan Issel and Louie Dampier.

In the 1973 ABA Finals, the Pacers defeated the Colonels 4-3 to capture the ABA championship, with Johnson playing 13 minutes and grabbing 6 rebounds in the decisive game seven, an 88-81 Pacers victory at Freedom Hall in Louisville, Kentucky. It was Johnson's final career game. Overall, Johnson averaged 2.7 points and 4.0 rebounds in the Finals off the bench.

Injuries limited Johnson's pro basketball career to 10 seasons.

Death
Shortly before his death from inoperable brain cancer, his no. 25 was retired by the Washington Bullets on his 48th birthday. Upon Johnson’s death, Bullets owner Abe Pollin remarked "Gus was the Dr. J of his time, and anyone who had the privilege of seeing him play will never forget what a great basketball player Gus Johnson was."

A month later he was also honored by the two college programs he played for, Boise State and Idaho, during a conference basketball game between the two teams on January 17, 1987. A crowd of 12,225 at the BSU Pavilion in Boise set a Big Sky attendance record for a regular season game, and the visiting Vandals overcame an eight-point deficit in the second half to win by ten. That month in a ceremony in Akron, his No. 43 was retired by Idaho, the first basketball number retired in school history.

Before his death and reflecting on his career, Johnson had expressed that his greatest fear was that he would die and his daughters "don't even know what their daddy did."

Johnson died less than four months later at Akron City Hospital on April 29, 1987, at the age of 48, and is buried at Mount Peace Cemetery in Akron. He was survived by his four daughters.

Accolades
Teammate Earl Monroe said of Gus Johnson – "Gus was ahead of his time, flying through the air for slam dunks, breaking backboards and throwing full-court passes behind his back. He was spectacular, but he also did the nitty gritty jobs, defense and rebounding. With all the guys in the Hall of Fame, Gus deserves to be there already."

"I first saw Gus on television...I had never seen a player dominate a game so. Gus was the Dr. J of his time and anyone that ever had the privilege to see him play will never forget what a great basketball player Gus Johnson was." – Abe Pollin – Former Owner of the Washington Bullets/Wizards Franchise.

"Gus Johnson was one of the greatest players I ever played with or against," teammate Wes Unseld said. "He was a ferocious defender and rebounder, and as a young player, I was completely in awe of his ability. He was truly a star ahead of his time."

"Gus was probably one of the roughest players I have ever played against. He was not a dirty player. He was one of the most tenacious
competitors ever to play the game." - Dave DeBusschere.

“If he played today, ol’ Gussie would be a human highlight film,” said Slick” Leonard of Johnson. “That’s what people remember the most. But there was a lot more to his game than the spectacular dunks. He was special. He could play, man.”

Honors

 Johnson was inducted into the Ohio Basketball Hall of Fame in 2007.
 In 2007, Johnson was inducted into the University of Idaho Hall of Fame.
 In 2010, Johnson was inducted into the Naismith Memorial Basketball Hall of Fame.
 Johnson's # 43 was retired by the University of Idaho as Johnson was honored during a game between Idaho and his other college, Boise State, in January 1987.
 Johnson's #25 was retired by the Washington Bullets on his birthday, December 13, 1986, months before his death.
Inducted in Boise State University Athletic Hall of Fame in 1987.

NBA/ABA career statistics

|-
| style="text-align:left;"|
| style="text-align:left;"|Baltimore
| 78 || – || 36.5 || .430 || – || .658 || 13.6 || 2.2 || – || – || 17.3
|-
| style="text-align:left;"|
| style="text-align:left;"|Baltimore
| 76 || – || 38.1 || .418 || – || .676 || 13.0 || 3.6 || – || – || 18.6
|-
| style="text-align:left;"|
| style="text-align:left;"|Baltimore
| 41 || – || 31.3 || .413 || – || .736 || 13.3 || 2.8 || – || – || 16.5
|-
| style="text-align:left;"| 
| style="text-align:left;"|Baltimore
| 73 || – || 36.0 || .450 || – || .708 || 11.7 || 2.7 || – || – || 20.7
|-
| style="text-align:left;"|
| style="text-align:left;"|Baltimore
| 60 || – || 37.9 || .467 || – || .667 || 13.0 || 2.7 || – || – || 19.1
|-
| style="text-align:left;"|
| style="text-align:left;"|Baltimore
| 49 || – || 34.1 || .459 || – || .717 || 11.6 || 2.0 || – || – || 17.9
|-
| style="text-align:left;"|
| style="text-align:left;"|Baltimore
| 78 || – || 37.4 || .451 || – || .724 || 13.9 || 3.4 || – || – || 17.3
|-
| style="text-align:left;"|
| style="text-align:left;"|Baltimore
| 66 || – || 38.5 || .453 || – || .738 || 17.1 || 2.9 || – || – || 18.2
|-
| style="text-align:left;"|
| style="text-align:left;"|Baltimore
| 39 || – || 17.1 || .383 || – || .683 || 5.8 || 1.3 || – || – || 6.4
|-
| style="text-align:left;"|
| style="text-align:left;"|Phoenix
| 21 || – || 19.9 || .381 || – || .694 || 6.5 || 1.5 || – || – || 7.8
|-
| style="text-align:left; background:#afe6ba;"|†
| style="text-align:left;"|Indiana (ABA)
| 50 || – || 15.1 || .441 || .190 || .738 || 4.9 || 1.2 || – || – || 6.0
|- class="sortbottom"
| style="text-align:center;" colspan="2"|Career
| 631 || – || 33.1 || .440 || .190 || .700 || 12.1 || 2.5 || – || – || 16.2
|- class="sortbottom"
| style="text-align:center;" colspan="2"|All-Star
| 5 || 0 || 19.8 || .429 || – || .760 || 7.0 || 1.2 || – || – || 13.4

Playoffs

|-
| style="text-align:left;"|1965
| style="text-align:left;”|Baltimore
| 10 || – || 37.7 || .358 || – || .739 || 11.1 || 3.4 || – || – || 15.8
|-
| style="text-align:left;"|1966
| style="text-align:left;”|Baltimore
| 1 || – || 8.0 || .250 || – || – || .0 || .0 || – || – || 2.0
|-
| style="text-align:left;"|1970
| style="text-align:left;”|Baltimore
| 7 || – || 42.6 || .459 || – || .794 || 11.4 || 1.3 || – || – || 18.4
|-
| style="text-align:left;"|1971
| style="text-align:left;”|Baltimore
| 11 || – || 33.2 || .422 || – || .745 || 10.4 || 2.7 || – || – || 13.0
|-
| style="text-align:left;"|1972
| style="text-align:left;”|Baltimore
| 5 || – || 15.4 || .300 || – || 1.000 || 5.0 || .6 || – || – || 4.0
|-
| style="text-align:left; background:#afe6ba;"|1973†
| style="text-align:left;”|Indiana (ABA)
| 17 || – || 10.8 || .254 || .000 || .750 || 4.1 || .9 || – || – || 2.5
|- class="sortbottom"
| style="text-align:center;" colspan="2"|Career
| 51 || – || 25.7 || .380 || .000 || .759 || 7.8 || 1.8 || – || – || 9.7

References

External links

NBA.com – statistics – Gus Johnson
NBA.com – Washington Wizards – history – Gus Johnson #25
Naismith Memorial Basketball Hall of Fame – Gus Johnson – inducted in 2010

1938 births
1987 deaths
20th-century African-American sportspeople
African-American sports announcers
African-American sports journalists
African-American basketball players
American men's basketball players
Baltimore Bullets (1963–1973) draft picks
Baltimore Bullets (1963–1973) players
Basketball players from Akron, Ohio
Boise State Broncos men's basketball players
Centers (basketball)
Deaths from brain cancer in the United States
Deaths from cancer in Ohio
Neurological disease deaths in Ohio
Idaho Vandals men's basketball players
Indiana Pacers players
Junior college men's basketball players in the United States
Naismith Memorial Basketball Hall of Fame inductees
National Basketball Association All-Stars
National Basketball Association broadcasters
National Basketball Association players with retired numbers
Phoenix Suns players
Power forwards (basketball)
Small forwards